Sherman is a U.S. city in and the county seat of Grayson County, Texas. The city's population in 2020 was 43,645. It is one of the two principal cities in the Sherman–Denison metropolitan statistical area, and it is part of the Texoma region of North Texas and southern Oklahoma.

History

Sherman was named after General Sidney Sherman (July 23, 1805 – August 1, 1873), a hero of the Texas Revolution. The community was designated as the county seat by the act of the Texas Legislature, which created Grayson County on March 17, 1846. In 1847, a post office began operation. By 1850, Sherman had become an incorporated town under Texas law. It had also become a stop on the Butterfield Overland Mail route through Texas. By 1852, Sherman had a population of 300 and consisted of a public square with a log court house, several businesses, a district clerk's office, and a church along the east side of the square. In 1861, the first flour mill was built.

During the 1850s and 1860s, Sherman continued to develop and to participate in regional politics. Because many residents of North Texas had migrated from the Upper South and only a low percentage were slaveholders,  considerable Unionist sentiment existed in the region. E. Junius Foster, the publisher of Sherman's antisecessionist Whig newspaper, the Patriot, circulated a petition to establish North Texas as an independent free state. Following Confederate passage of a conscription law,  resistance arose to conscription in North Texas, especially as owners of many slaves were exempt.

A group of slaveholders in nearby Cooke County feared the Unionists might join others and perform acts of sabotage. In October 1862, a unit of state militia arrested between 150 and 200 men on suspicion of insurrection. In the Great Hanging at Gainesville, 42 of the arrested men were killed, most of them hanged by a mob, while others were sentenced to death by a self-appointed "citizens' court". Following the lynchings, Colonel William Young, who had organized the jury for the "citizens' court", was killed by unknown assailants. Young had been responsible for more than 20 deaths. Newspaper publisher Foster "applauded" Young's death, and was soon gunned down by Capt. Jim Young, the colonel's son.

Pro-Confederate militiamen rounded up even more "suspects" in Sherman, but Confederate Brigadier General James W. Throckmorton intervened to stop the killings. By the time Throckmorton restored order, only five of the originally arrested men were still alive.

Late in the Civil War, pro-Confederate guerrillas led by William Quantrill spent the winter in Sherman. Former guerrilla Jesse James also came to Sherman for his honeymoon. He was photographed seated on his horse in Sherman.

During the 1860s, secondary education developed in North Texas. The Sherman Male and Female High School began accepting students in 1866, under the patronage of the North Texas Methodist Conference. It became one of three private schools operating in Sherman. The school operated under several names, including the North Texas Female College and Conservatory of Music from 1892 to 1919 and Kidd-Key College and Conservatory, from 1919 to 1935. It gradually lost Methodist support, following the opening of Southern Methodist University in Dallas in 1915. In 1876, Austin College, the oldest continuously operating college in Texas, was relocated to Sherman from Huntsville. The Sherman Female Institute, later called Mary Nash College, opened in 1877 under sponsorship of the Baptist Church. It continued to operate until 1901, when the campus was sold to Kidd-Key College. Carr–Burdette College, a women's college affiliated with the Disciples of Christ, operated from 1894 to 1929. Sherman also has a long history within the Jewish community. By 1873, Jews in the region regularly met for the High Holidays.

While  general depression and lawlessness occurred during the Reconstruction, Sherman remained commercially active. During the 1870s, Sherman's population reached 6,000. In 1875, after  two fires destroyed many buildings east of the town square, a number of civic buildings were rebuilt using more permanent materials. This included a new Grayson County Courthouse built in 1876. In 1879, the Old Settlers' Association of North Texas formed and met near Sherman. The organization  incorporated in 1898 and purchased Old Settlers' Park in 1909.

On May 15, 1896, a tornado measuring F5 on the Fujita scale struck Sherman. About 50 homes were destroyed, with 20 of them obliterated.

In 1901, the first electric "Interurban" railway in Texas, the Denison and Sherman Railway, was completed between Sherman and Denison. The Texas Traction Company completed a  interurban between Sherman and Dallas in 1908, and in 1911 purchased the Denison and Sherman Railway. Through the connections in Dallas and Denison, travel to the Texas destinations of Terrell, Corsicana, Waco, Fort Worth, Cleburne, and Denton, became possible, as well as to Durant, Oklahoma, by interurban railways. One popular destination on the Interurban between Sherman and Denison was Wood Lake Park, a private amusement park at the time. By 1948, all interurban rail service in Texas had been discontinued.

Sherman Riot of 1930

During the Sherman Riot of May 9, 1930, the Grayson County Courthouse was burned down by local citizens in an attempt to lynch George Hughes, an African American suspected of assaulting a white woman. During the riot, Hughes was locked in the vault at the courthouse and apparently died in the fire. Rescue work was hindered by saboteurs cutting the fire hoses. After rioters retrieved Hughes' body from the vault, it was dragged behind a car, hanged, and set afire. The black business section of Sherman was also burned down, and many African Americans fled. Texas Ranger Frank Hamer was in Sherman during this riot, and reported the situation to Texas Governor Dan Moody. Governor Moody sent National Guard troops to Sherman on May 9 and martial law was declared in Sherman for ten days. Fourteen men were later indicted, not for lynching, but for arson and rioting. In the end, only J.B. "Screw" McCasland was convicted and sentenced to prison for arson and for rioting.

Geography
Sherman is located slightly east of the center of Grayson County, between Denison to the north and Howe to the south.

Climate
Sherman is part of the humid subtropical climate area.

Demographics

2020 census

As of the 2020 United States census, there were 43,645 people, 15,687 households, and 10,097 families residing in the city.

2010 census
As of the 2010 census,  38,521 people, 14,864 households, and 8,820 families were residing in the city. The population density was 910.0 people/sq mi (351.4/km). The 14,926 housing units averaged 387.2/sq mi (149.5/km). The racial makeup of the city was 78.6% White, 11.4% African American, 0.8% Native American, 2.1% Asian, and 3.7% from two or more races. Hispanics or Latinos of any race were 19.8% of the population.

Of the 14,864 households, 30.9% had children under the age of 18 living with them, 46.7% were married couples living together, 13.4% had a female householder with no husband present, and 35.8% were not families. About 30.4% of all households were made up of individuals, and 12.5% had someone living alone who was 65 years of age or older. The average household size was 2.59, and the average family size was 3.01.

In the city, the age distribution was  25.9% under 18, 13.1% from 18 to 24, 27.8% from 25 to 44, 19.3% from 45 to 64, and 13.5% who were 65  or older. The median age was 34 years. For every 100 females, there were 92.1 males. For every 100 females age 18 and over, there were 89.3 males.

The median income for a household in the city was $43,557. Males had a median income of $31,828 versus $23,363 for females. The per capita income for the city was $22,029.  About 19.9% of the population was below the poverty line.

Government
Sherman operates under a council-manager form of local government, and is a home rule city under Texas state law. As of 2022, the city was led by City Manager Robby Hefton and Mayor David Plyler.

The Texas Department of Criminal Justice operates the Sherman District Parole Office in Sherman.

Education

Public schools
Most children in Sherman are zoned to the Sherman Independent School District, which includes Sherman High School. Some parts are in Denison Independent School District or Howe Independent School District.

Private schools
A small percentage of children attend one of the three private schools in Sherman: Grayson Christian School, St. Mary's Catholic School, or Texoma Christian School.

Colleges and universities
Austin College, a private, Presbyterian, liberal arts college, relocated to Sherman in 1876. Founded in 1849, it is the oldest college or university in Texas operating under its original charter. Grayson College, a community college based in neighboring Denison, operates a branch campus in Sherman.

Libraries
The Sherman Public Library serves the city of Sherman and all citizens. The library underwent a $2 million, floor-to-ceiling renovation in 2017, reopening to the public in August 2018.

Media

Magazine
 Texoma Living! magazine

Newspaper
 The Herald Democrat

Radio stations
 KLAK Adult Contemporary 97.5
 KMAD  Mad Rock 102.5
 KMKT  Katy Country 93.1
 KQDR  Doc FM 107.3
  KJIMKJIM  The Memory Maker AM 1500 and FM 101.3 Sherman's Oldest and Newest Radio Station

Television stations

 KTEN Channel 10 – (NBC)
 KTEN DT Channel 10.2 – (The CW Texoma)
 KTEN DT Channel 10.3 – (ABC)
 KXII Channel 12 – (CBS)
 KXII DT Channel 12.2 (My Texoma)
 KXII DT Channel 12.3 (Fox Texoma)

Infrastructure

Transportation
 U.S. Highway 75      Oklahoma to Dallas

Sherman is served by two U.S. Highways: US 75 (Sam Rayburn Freeway) and US 82. (The latter is locally designated as the Buck Owens Freeway after the famous musician who was born in Sherman.) It is also served by three Texas State Highways, which extend beyond Grayson County: State Highway 11, State Highway 56, and State Highway 91 (Texoma Parkway), one of the main commercial strips that connects Sherman and Denison, and also extends to Lake Texoma.

General aviation service is provided by Sherman Municipal Airport and North Texas Regional Airport/Perrin Field in Denison.

TAPS Public Transit is the sole transit provider for Sherman, with curb-to-curb paratransit for all residents.

Medical care
The city of Sherman is served locally by Wilson N. Jones Regional Medical Center, Texoma Medical Center, and a Baylor Scott & White surgery center.

Top employers

 Tyson Foods
 Texas Instruments
 II-VI Incorporated
 Grayson County
 City of Sherman
 Cooper B-Line Systems  
 Austin College 
 Fisher Controls/ Emerson Process Management 
 Kaiser Aluminum 
 Presco Products
 Progress Rail 
 Consolidated Containers
 Plyler Construction
 Starr Aircraft
 Douglass Distributing 
 GlobiTech 
 Sunny Delight Beverages

Notable people

See also

 May 1896 tornado outbreak sequence
 Sherman, Texas bus accident
 Sherman, Texas minor league baseball teams

Notes

References

Further reading
 Grayson County Frontier Village, The History of Grayson County Texas, Hunter Publishing Co., Winston-Salem, North Carolina, 1979.
 Redshaw, Peggy A., "Sherman, Texas, and the 1918 Pandemic Flu," East Texas Historical Journal, 51 (Spring 2013), 67–85.
 E. R. Bills (author). Black Holocaust: The Paris Horror and a Legacy of Texas Terror. Charleston, SC: The History Press, 2015.

External links

 City of Sherman official website
 Sherman Chamber of Commerce
 Sherman article in the Handbook of Texas
 

Cities in Texas
Cities in Grayson County, Texas
County seats in Texas
Populated places established in 1846
Butterfield Overland Mail in Texas
1846 establishments in Texas
Stagecoach stops in the United States